Elections to the Jaintia Hills Autonomous District Council (JHADC) were held on 27 February 2020. The votes were counted on 2 March 2020 with the NPP emerging as the largest party alliance in the Council with 12 and its ally UDP with 10 seats respectively.

Schedule

Results
The counting was held on 2 March 2019. The NPP emerged single largest party by winning 12 seats.

By Party

By Constituency

Executive Council Formation

References

External links

2019 elections in India
Elections in Meghalaya
Autonomous district council elections in India